Larinopoda is a genus of butterflies in the family Lycaenidae. The species of this genus are endemic to the Afrotropical realm.

Species
Larinopoda aspidos Druce, 1890
Larinopoda batesi Bethune-Baker, 1926
Larinopoda eurema (Plötz, 1880)
Larinopoda lagyra (Hewitson, 1866)
Larinopoda lircaea (Hewitson, 1866)
Larinopoda tera (Hewitson, 1873)

References

Poritiinae
Lycaenidae genera
Taxa named by Arthur Gardiner Butler